Stacey Angela Dixon (born January 9, 1971) is an American mechanical engineer and intelligence official and Principal Deputy Director of National Intelligence in the Biden Administration since August 4, 2021.

Education 
Dixon earned a Bachelor of Science in mechanical engineering from Stanford University in 1993, followed by a Master of Science in 1995 and a Doctor of Philosophy in 2000 in the same from Georgia Tech. Her doctoral thesis was entitled Biomechanical analysis of coronary arteries using a complementary energy model and designed experiments. She completed a chemical engineering postdoctoral fellowship at the University of Minnesota College of Science and Engineering.

Career 
As an undergraduate, Dixon was an intern at Nokia Bell Labs. From 2003 to 2007, she worked at the Central Intelligence Agency, where she was detailed to the advanced systems and technology directorate of the National Reconnaissance Office. From 2007 to 2010, Dixon was a staffer on the United States House Permanent Select Committee on Intelligence. She then joined the National Geospatial-Intelligence Agency and, between 2010 and 2016, served sequentially as chief of congressional and intergovernmental affairs, deputy director of corporate communications, and deputy director of NGA's research directorate. Dixon then served as the deputy director of the Intelligence Advanced Research Projects Activity from 2016 to 2018 and director from 2018 to July 2019, when she became the eighth deputy director of the National Geospatial-Intelligence Agency.

Dixon is also a presidentially-appointed member of the Coast Guard Academy Board of Visitors, an appointed NGA Liaison to the United States Geospatial Intelligence Foundation Board of Directors and Spelman College Center of Excellence for Minority Women in STEM  Leadership Advisory Board.

President Joe Biden announced plans to nominate then-NGA Deputy Director Dixon for the position of principal deputy director of national intelligence on April 21, 2021. She was confirmed by voice vote on August 3 and received praise from Director of National Intelligence Avril Haines. She was sworn in on August 4, 2021 and is the highest-ranking Black woman in the intelligence community.

References 

1971 births
Living people
Stanford University School of Engineering alumni
Engineers from Washington, D.C.
Georgia Tech alumni
American mechanical engineers
Obama administration personnel
Trump administration personnel
National Geospatial-Intelligence Agency people
Biden administration personnel
United States Deputy Directors of National Intelligence
21st-century American engineers
21st-century American women scientists
African-American women engineers
African-American engineers
American women engineers
21st-century African-American scientists
21st-century women engineers